Hemidactylus tenkatei is a species of gecko. It is found in Indonesia and East Timor.

References

Hemidactylus
Reptiles described in 1895
Reptiles of Timor
Reptiles of Indonesia